His Wife, The Unknown is a 1923 German silent drama film directed by Benjamin Christensen. Prints of the film exist in the Det Danske Filminstitut.

Cast
 Willy Fritsch as Wilbur Crawford
 Lil Dagover as Eva
 Edith Edwards as Mabel
 Karl Falkenberg as Tangotänzer
 Jaro Fürth as Polizeikommissar
 Martin Lübbert as Jack
 Karl Platen as Sam
 Paul Rehkopf as Detektiv
 Maria Reisenhofer as Crawfords Mutter
 Mathilde Sussin as Frau Hurst
 Maria Wefers as Esther

References

External links
 

1923 films
1923 drama films
Films of the Weimar Republic
German drama films
German silent feature films
German black-and-white films
Films directed by Benjamin Christensen
UFA GmbH films
Silent drama films
1920s German films